Thomas Crowther (1794–1859), was an evangelical clergyman in the Church of England.

Thomas Crowther may also refer to:

Thomas Crowther (judge) (born 1970), British judge, who currently serves as a circuit judge
Thomas Crowther (ecologist) (born 1986), British scientist